Taherabad (also Romanized as Ţāherābād) is a village in Miyandasht Rural District, in the Central District of Kashan County, Isfahan Province, Iran. At the 2006 census, its population was 3,404, in 923 families.

References 

Populated places in Kashan County